Oncopera mitocera is a moth of the family Hepialidae. It is found in Queensland, Australia.

Adults have wings with little discernible pattern.

The larvae are subterranean and feed on the roots and bases of grasses in native and sown pastures, including Digitaria, Panicum and Setaria.

References

Hepialidae
Moths of Queensland